Xylophanes neoptolemus is a moth of the  family Sphingidae.

Distribution
It is found from Trinidad and Suriname to Venezuela and north-western Brazil. It is probably present in much of South America.

Description
It is similar to Xylophanes loelia and Xylophanes libya but has a deeper red coloration of the median band of the hindwing upperside. The mesothorax and metathorax have a pale grey medial band that continues onto the abdomen as a pair of thin lines, enclosing a darker olive-green or brown median line. The first and fourth postmedian lines on the forewings is narrow and continuous from the inner margin to the apex. The area between these lines is yellow, contrasting with the pinkish coloration of the rest of the wing. There is a black subapical dot which is generally very small. The median band on the hindwing upperside is bright red and relatively broad, tapering towards and reaching or almost reaching the costa.

Biology
Adults are probably on wing year-round.

References

neoptolemus
Moths described in 1780